George IV, also known as Lasha Giorgi (1191–1223), of the Bagrationi dynasty, was a king of Georgia from 1213 to 1223.

Life

A son of Queen Regnant Tamar and her consort David Soslan, George was declared as a coregent by his mother in 1207. According to the Georgian chronicles the second name Lasha meant 'illuminator of the world' in the language of Apsar (cf. a-lasha meaning light in Abkhaz language). He had princely domain in Javakheti, centered at Alastani, for which he was known by the title of javakht' up'ali, i.e., "the Lord of the Javakhians" as suggested by a type of silver coins struck in his name.

George IV continued Tamar's policy of strengthening of the Georgia feudal state. He put down the revolts in neighbouring Muslim vassal states in the 1210s and began preparations for a large-scale campaign against Jerusalem to support the Crusaders in 1220. However, the Mongol approach to the Georgian borders made the Crusade plan unrealistic. The first Mongol expedition defeated two Georgian armies in 1221–1222 and left through Inner Caucasus. Georgians suffered heavy losses in this war and the King himself was severely wounded. King Georgi IV went to Bagavan, Armenia,
to secure his sister's marriage to the Shah of Shirvan and ensure her succession. Lasha George became an invalid and died prematurely in Bagavan at the age of 31.  He was succeeded by his sister Rusudan.

George Lasha was known as an open minded person and met much criticism from a conservative feudal society. The nobles and Christian clergymen rejected his wife and failed to recognize her as queen. She was a girl from a family of commoners. Ultimately, the King had to compromise and divorced her formally, refusing, however, to marry anyone else.

Some medieval sources characterize George IV as a wise ruler and brave warrior, while others point to his immoral life style and addiction to mysticism and even Sufism.

He was survived by a son David (the future King David VII Ulu). George was buried at Gelati monastery.

See also 
Kazreti monastery

References

 Halfter, P. "Die militärischen Triumphe der Georgier und ein wenig beachtetes Erdbeben an der Grenze Armenisch-Kilikiens (c. Ende August 1213)," Le Muséon, 122,3-4 (2009), pp. 423–447.

External links
 https://web.archive.org/web/20040702230322/http://www.bigvava.ge/unificationoffeudalgeorgia.html

Kings of Georgia
1191 births
1223 deaths
Eastern Orthodox monarchs
Bagrationi dynasty of the Kingdom of Georgia
12th-century people from Georgia (country)
13th-century people from Georgia (country)